Mumbaikar is an upcoming Indian Hindi-language action thriller film directed by Santosh Sivan. A remake of Tamil film Maanagaram (2017), it stars Vikrant Massey and Vijay Sethupathi. This marks Sethupathi's Hindi film debut.

Principal photography commenced in January 2021.

Cast 
 Vikrant Massey
 Vijay Sethupathi
 Tanya Maniktala
 Raghav Binani 
 Hridhu Haroon 
 Sanjay Mishra
 Ranvir Shorey
 Sachin Khedekar

References

External links 
 

Upcoming Indian films
Hindi remakes of Tamil films
Upcoming films